Mattia Dal Bello (19 January 1984 – 12 December 2004) was an Italian professional footballer who played as a midfielder.

Club career 
Born in Asolo, Dal Bello joined Milan's youth system from Reggiana in 2000. He made his professional debut on 12 December 2002, in a Coppa Italia home game against Ancona that Milan won 5–1. He went on to make his first and only Serie A appearance in a 2–4 loss to Piacenza on 24 May 2003.

In January 2004, Dal Bello was loaned out to Serie C1 club Prato, where he made 13 appearances before the deal was terminated early in November of the same year. He died in a car accident on 12 December 2004, as he drove his Audi A3 into a wall. A friend of his, who was in the car with him, survived without being seriously injured.

References 

1984 births
2004 deaths
People from Asolo
Road incident deaths in Italy
Italian footballers
Serie A players
A.C. Milan players
A.C. Prato players
Association football midfielders
Footballers from Veneto
Sportspeople from the Province of Treviso